Narcissism is a self-centered personality style characterized as having an excessive preoccupation with oneself and one's own needs, often at the expense of others.

Narcissism exists on a continuum that ranges from normal to abnormal personality expression. While there exists normal, healthy levels of narcissism in humans, there are also more extreme levels of narcissism, being seen particularly in people who are self-absorbed, or people who have a pathological mental illness like narcissistic personality disorder. 

It is one of the traits featured in the dark triad, along with Machiavellianism and subclinical psychopathy.

History of thought

The term "narcissism" comes from the Roman poet Ovid's Metamorphoses, written in the year 8 AD. Book III of the poem tells the mythical story of a handsome young man, Narcissus, who spurns the advances of many potential lovers. When Narcissus rejects the nymph Echo, who was cursed to only echo the sounds that others made, the gods punish Narcissus by making him fall in love with his own reflection in a pool of water. When Narcissus discovers that the object of his love cannot love him back, he slowly pines away and dies.

The concept of excessive selfishness has been recognized throughout history. In ancient Greece, the concept was understood as hubris.

It wasn't until the late 1800s that narcissism began to be defined in psychological terms. Since that time, the term narcissism has had a significant divergence in meaning in psychology. It has been used to describe
 a sexual perversion,
 a normal [healthy] developmental stage,
 a symptom in psychosis, and
 a characteristic in several of the object relations [subtypes]. Paul Näcke and Havelock Ellis (1889) are the first psychiatrists, independent of each other, to use the term "narcissism" to describe a person who treats his own body in the same way in which the body of a sexual partner is ordinarily treated. Narcissism, in this context, was seen as a perversion that consumed a person's entire sexual life. In 1911 Otto Rank published the first clinical paper about narcissism, linking it to vanity and self-admiration.

Ernest Jones (1913) was the first to construe extreme narcissism, which he called the "God-complex", as a character flaw. He described people with God-complex as being aloof, self-important, overconfident, auto-erotic, inaccessible, self-admiring, and exhibitionistic, with fantasies of omnipotence and omniscience. He observed that these people had a high need for uniqueness.

Sigmund Freud (1914) published his theory of narcissism in a lengthy essay titled "On Narcissism: An Introduction". Freud postulated that all humans have a level of narcissism from birth (primary narcissism), it is healthy, and in time, evolves outward as love for others. Freud had declared that narcissism was a necessary intermediate stage between auto-eroticism and object-love, love for others. He also theorized that narcissism becomes a neurosis (secondary narcissism) when individuals who had reached the point of projecting their affections to others, turned their affection back on themselves. In time these individuals become cut off from society and uninterested in others.

Robert Waelder (1925) was the first to conceptualize narcissism as a personality trait. His definition described individuals who are condescending, feel superior to others, are preoccupied with admiration, and exhibit a lack of empathy. Waelder's work and his case study have been influential in the way narcissism and the clinical disorder Narcissistic personality disorder are defined today. His patient was a successful scientist with an attitude of superiority, an obsession with fostering self-respect, and a lack of normal feelings of guilt. The patient was aloof and independent from others, had an inability to empathize with others, and was selfish sexually. Waelder's patient was also overly logical and analytical and valued abstract intellectual thought over the practical application of scientific knowledge.

Karen Horney (1939) postulated that narcissism was on a spectrum that ranged from healthy self-esteem to a pathological state.

The term entered the broader social consciousness following the publication of The Culture of Narcissism by Christopher Lasch in 1979. Since then, social media, bloggers, and self-help authors have indiscriminately applied "narcissism"  as a label for the self-serving and for all domestic abusers.

Characteristics

Narcissism is not necessarily 'good' or 'bad'; it depends on the contexts and outcomes being measured. In certain social contexts such as initiating social relationships, and with certain outcome variables, such as feeling good about oneself, healthy narcissism can be helpful. In other contexts, such as maintaining long-term relationships and with outcome variables, such as accurate self-knowledge, narcissism can be unhelpful.

Four dimensions of narcissism as a personality variable have been delineated: leadership/authority, superiority/arrogance, self-absorption/self-admiration, and exploitativeness/entitlement.

Normal and healthy levels of narcissism
In the history of psychoanalytics, a healthy, modest amount of narcissism has been viewed as an essential component of mature self-esteem and basic self-worth. In essence, narcissistic behaviors are a system of intrapersonal and interpersonal strategies devoted to protecting one's self-esteem.

It has been suggested that healthy narcissism is correlated with good psychological health. Self-esteem works as a mediator between narcissism and psychological health. Therefore, because of their elevated self-esteem, deriving from self-perceptions of competence and likability, high narcissists are relatively free of worry and gloom.

Destructive levels of narcissism
Narcissism, in and of itself, is a normal personality trait. However, high levels of narcissistic behavior can be damaging and self-defeating. Destructive narcissism is the constant exhibition of a few of the intense characteristics usually associated with pathological Narcissistic Personality Disorder such as a "pervasive pattern of grandiosity", which is characterized by feelings of entitlement and superiority, arrogant or haughty behaviors, and a generalized lack of empathy and concern for others. On a spectrum, destructive narcissism is more extreme than healthy narcissism but not as extreme as the pathological condition.

Pathological levels of narcissism

Extremely high levels of narcissistic behavior are considered pathological. The pathological condition of narcissism is, as Freud suggested, a magnified, extreme manifestation of healthy narcissism.  Freud's idea of narcissism described a pathology that manifests itself in the inability to love others, a lack of empathy, emptiness, boredom, and an unremitting need to search for power, while making the person unavailable to others. The clinical theorists Kernberg, Kohut and Theodore Millon all saw pathological narcissism as a possible outcome in response to unempathic and inconsistent early childhood interactions. They suggested that narcissists try to compensate in adult relationships. German psychoanalyst  Karen Horney (1885–1952) also saw the narcissistic personality as a temperament trait molded by a certain kind of early environment.

Heritability
Heritability studies using twins have shown that narcissistic traits, as measured by standardized tests, are often inherited. Narcissism was found to have a high heritability score (0.64) indicating that the concordance of this trait in the identical twins was significantly influenced by genetics as compared to an environmental causation. It has also been shown that there is a continuum or spectrum of narcissistic traits ranging from normal to a pathological personality. Furthermore, evidence suggests that individual elements of narcissism have their own heritability score. For example, intrapersonal grandiosity has a score of 0.23, and interpersonal entitlement has a score of 0.35. While the genetic impact on narcissism levels is significant, it isn't the only factor at play.

Expressions of narcissism

Sexual 
Sexual narcissism has been described as an egocentric pattern of sexual behavior that involves an inflated sense of sexual ability or sexual entitlement, sometimes in the form of extramarital affairs. This can be overcompensation for low self-esteem or an inability to sustain true intimacy.

While this behavioral pattern is believed to be more common in men than in women, it occurs in both males and females who compensate for feelings of sexual inadequacy by becoming overly proud or obsessed with their masculinity or femininity.

The controversial condition referred to as "sexual addiction" is believed by some experts to be sexual narcissism or sexual compulsivity, rather than an addictive behavior.

Parental 

Narcissistic parents often see their children as extensions of themselves, and encourage the children to act in ways that support the parents' emotional and self-esteem needs. Due to their vulnerability, children may be significantly affected by this behavior. To meet the parents’ needs, the child may sacrifice their own wants and feelings. A child subjected to this type of parenting may struggle in adulthood with their intimate relationships.

In extreme situations, this parenting style can result in estranged relationships with the children, coupled with feelings of resentment, and in some cases, self-destructive tendencies.

Origins of narcissism in children can often come from the social learning theory. The social learning theory proposes that social behavior is learned by observing and imitating others behavior. This suggests that children are anticipated to grow up to be narcissistic when their parents overvalue them.

Workplace narcissism

 Professionals. There is a compulsion of some professionals to constantly assert their competence, even when they are wrong. Professional narcissism can lead otherwise capable, and even exceptional, professionals to fall into narcissistic traps. "Most professionals work on cultivating a self that exudes authority, control, knowledge, competence and respectability. It's the narcissist in us all—we dread appearing stupid or incompetent."
 Executives. Executives are often provided with potential narcissistic triggers: 
 inanimate – status symbols like company cars, company-issued smartphone, or prestigious offices with window views; and
 animate – flattery and attention from colleagues and subordinates. 
 Narcissism has been linked to a range of potential leadership problems ranging from poor motivational skills to risky decision making, and in extreme cases, white-collar crime. High-profile corporate leaders that place an extreme emphasis on profits may yield positive short-term benefits for their organizations, but ultimately it drags down individual employees as well as entire companies.

 Subordinates may find everyday offers of support swiftly turn them into enabling sources, unless they are very careful to maintain proper boundaries.

 Studies examining the role of personality in the rise to leadership have shown that individuals who rise to leadership positions can be described as inter-personally dominant, extroverted, and socially skilled. When examining the correlation of narcissism in the rise to leadership positions, narcissists who are often inter-personally dominant, extroverted, and socially skilled, were also likely to rise to leadership but were more likely to emerge as leaders in situations where they were not known, such as in outside hires (versus internal promotions). Paradoxically, narcissism can present as characteristics that facilitate an individual's rise to leadership, and ultimately lead that person to underachieve or even to fail.

 General workforce. Narcissism can create problems in the general workforce. For example, individuals high in narcissism inventories are more likely to engage in counterproductive behavior that harms organizations or other people in the workplace. Aggressive (and counterproductive) behaviors tend to surface when self-esteem is threatened. Individuals high in narcissism have fragile self-esteem and are easily threatened. One study found that employees who are high in narcissism are more likely to perceive the behaviors of others in the workplace as abusive and threatening than individuals who are low in narcissism.

Celebrity narcissism
Celebrity narcissism (sometimes referred to as Acquired situational narcissism) is a form of narcissism that develops in late adolescence or adulthood, brought on by wealth, fame and the other trappings of celebrity. Celebrity narcissism develops after childhood, and is triggered and supported by the celebrity-obsessed society. Fans, assistants and tabloid media all play into the idea that the person really is vastly more important than other people, triggering a narcissistic problem that might have been only a tendency, or latent, and helping it to become a full-blown personality disorder. "Robert Millman says that what happens to celebrities is that they get so used to people looking at them that they stop looking back at other people." In its most extreme presentation and symptoms, it is indistinguishable from narcissistic personality disorder, differing only in its late onset and its environmental support by large numbers of fans. "The lack of social norms, controls, and of people centering them makes these people believe they're invulnerable," so that the person may suffer from unstable relationships, substance abuse or erratic behaviors.

Collective narcissism 

Collective narcissism is a type of narcissism where an individual has an inflated self-love of their own group. While the classic definition of narcissism focuses on the individual, collective narcissism asserts that one can have a similar excessively high opinion of a group, and that a group can function as a narcissistic entity. Collective narcissism is related to ethnocentrism; however, ethnocentrism primarily focuses on self-centeredness at an ethnic or cultural level, while collective narcissism is extended to any type of ingroup beyond just cultures and ethnicities.

Normalization of narcissistic behaviors

Some commentators contend that the American populace has become increasingly narcissistic since the end of World War II. People compete mightily for attention. In social situations they tend to steer the conversation away from others and toward themselves. The profusion of popular literature about "listening" and "managing those who talk constantly about themselves" suggests its pervasiveness in everyday life. This claim is substantiated by the growth of "reality TV" programs, the growth of an online culture in which digital media, social media and the desire for fame are generating a "new era of public narcissism."

Also supporting the contention that American culture has become more narcissistic is an analysis of US popular song lyrics between 1987 and 2007. This found a growth in the use of first-person singular pronouns, reflecting a greater focus on the self, and also of references to antisocial behavior; during the same period, there was a diminution of words reflecting a focus on others, positive emotions, and social interactions. References to narcissism and self-esteem in American popular print media have experienced vast inflation since the late 1980s. Between 1987 and 2007 direct mentions of self-esteem in leading US newspapers and magazines increased by 4,540 per cent while narcissism, which had been almost non-existent in the press during the 1970s, was referred to over 5,000 times between 2002 and 2007.

Individualistic vs collectivist national cultures

Similar patterns of change in cultural production are observable in other Western states. For example, a linguistic analysis of the largest circulation Norwegian newspaper found that the use of self-focused and individualistic terms increased in frequency by 69 per cent between 1984 and 2005 while collectivist terms declined by 32 per cent.

One study looked at differences in advertising between an individualistic culture, United States, and a collectivist culture, South Korea and found that in the US there was a greater tendency to stress the distinctiveness and uniqueness of the person; where as advertising in South Korean stressed the importance of social conformity and harmony. These cultural differences were greater than the effects of individual differences within national cultures.

Controversies
There has been an increased interest in narcissism and narcissistic personality disorder (NPD) in the last 10 years. There are areas of substantial debate that surround the subject including:
 clearly defining the difference between normal and pathological narcissism,
 understanding the role of self-esteem in narcissism, 
 reaching a consensus on the classifications and definitions of sub-types such as "grandiose" and "vulnerable dimensions" or variants of these, 
 understanding what are the central versus peripheral, primary versus secondary features/characteristics of narcissism, 
 determining if there is consensual description, 
 agreeing on the etiological factors, 
 deciding what field or discipline narcissism should be studied by, 
 agreeing on how it should be assessed and measured, and 
 agreeing on its representation in textbooks and classification manuals.

This extent of the controversy was on public display in 2010-2013 when the committee on personality disorders for the 5th Edition (2013) of the Diagnostic and Statistical Manual of Mental Disorders recommended the removal of Narcissistic Personality from the manual. A contentious three year debate unfolded in the clinical community with one of the sharpest critics being professor John Gunderson, MD, the person who led the DSM personality disorders committee for the 4th edition of the manual.

See also 
 Compensation
 Empathy
 Entitlement
 Grandiosity
 Self-esteem
 Narcissistic personality disorder

References

Further reading 

 
 
 
 
 )
 

 
1889 introductions
1890s neologisms
Self
Barriers to critical thinking
Social influence
Egoism